is a Shinto shrine in Tokorozawa, Saitama, Japan.

History 
Tradition holds that the Tokorozawa Shinmei Shrine was founded in 110 CE by Yamato Takeru during his conquest of eastern Japan and the shrine claims to have been one of the most important centers for the worship of Amaterasu in the Kantō region; however, all records were lost in a fire in 1826. With the establishment of the Imperial Japanese Army’s Tokorozawa Air Field in 1911, pioneering pilot Yoshitoshi Tokugawa began a tradition of praying at this shrine for air safety.

Enshrined kami
Amaterasu Ōmikami
Ukanomitama
Mount Miwa

Festivals 
The major Japanese festivals of the shrine are:
 January 1 – Gantan-sai (New Year’s Festival)
 February 3 – Setsubun (traditional beginning of spring)
 April 21 – Chi-sai
 First Sunday in June – Ningyō-kuyō (Doll’s Day)
 June 30 - Nagoshi-no Ō-harae (Summer Purification Ceremony)
 September 15 – Tai-sai

External links

 

Buildings and structures in Tokorozawa, Saitama
Shinto shrines in Saitama Prefecture